Mount Bergin is a mountain, 700 m, standing 4 nautical miles (7 km) west of Mount Maslen in the Raggatt Mountains, Enderby Land. It was plotted from air photos taken from ANARE (Australian National Antarctic Research Expeditions) aircraft in 1956. It was named by Antarctic Names Committee of Australia (ANCA) for R.D. Bergin, radio officer at Mawson station in 1956.

Mountains of Enderby Land